David Brant Haviland (born July 22, 1961, in Bar Harbor, Maine), is a Swedish-American physicist, professor in nanostructure physics and mesoscopic physics at the Royal Institute of Technology  in Sweden.

Haviland grew up in Ames, Iowa, and studied physics at Union College 1979–83, New York. Within the Fulbright program 1983/84 he was at the University of Göttingen. He received his Ph.D. in 1989 at the University of Minnesota. Between 1989 and 1997 he worked at Chalmers University of Technology before joining the Royal Institute of Technology as a professor in  1997.

His research on fundamental and applied physics in mesoscopic condensed matter. His research is focused on superconducting insulator quantum phase transition in thin films and related phenomena in single Josephson junctions and SQUIDs. He is also developing experimental and theoretical methods to investigate nonlinear dynamical systems by measuring and analyzing the intermodulation (frequency mixing, frequency mixing), this method was patented  and was developed for use in atomic force microscopy. Haviland has over 100 peer reviewed articles.

Haviland was awarded the Wallmark Prize in 2008 "for his discoveries concerning the development of mesoscopic physics". He was elected in 2011 as member of the Royal Swedish Academy of Sciences, and is presently a member of the Nobel Committee for Physics.

Publications

References

External links 
 Homepage

1961 births
Living people
21st-century American physicists
Academic staff of the KTH Royal Institute of Technology
Union College (New York) alumni
University of Göttingen alumni
University of Minnesota alumni
Scientists from New York (state)
Members of the Royal Swedish Academy of Sciences